Daniel Frank Craig (3 October 1875 – 17 April 1929) was a United States army officer. He served in a number of U.S. military conflicts including in the Philippines, Mexico and World War I.

Early life
Craig was born on 3 October 1875 in Mahaska County near Oskaloosa, Iowa to Mr. and Mrs. Samuel Craig.

Military career
On 18 May 1898 Craig became first lieutenant of the 20th Kansas Infantry, advancing to captain the following year. Not long after being honorably discharged on 12 June 1899, he was recommissioned as captain of the 36th United States Volunteer Infantry, where he served until being honorably mustered out on 16 March 1901. Craig was commissioned second lieutenant of the Artillery Corps on 8 May 1901, promoted to first lieutenant on 28 July 1903 and again promoted to captain, this time of the Fourth Field Artillery Brigade, on 25 Jan 1907. During this time Craig served in the Philippines between 1898 and 1901 and 1904–1907. Craig later served in Mexico at Veracruz (1914) and in the Punitive Expedition against Pancho Villa (1916). After serving in Mexico, Craig became part of the General Staff Corps on 25 Nov 1916, acting as chief of staff of the 12th Infantry Division until becoming the assistant chief of staff of the Southern Department on 24 March 1917. He later become part of the War College Division as General Staff in Washington, D.C., from April to June 1917, during which he was promoted to major on 15 May 1917. In August 1917 he went to France as a colonel in the National Army. During World War I, Craig served as a commanding officer of various artillery brigades, ultimately becoming brigadier general in October 1918. He commanded the 302nd Regimented Field Artillery, 151st Brigade, 76th Division and the 157th Field Artillery Brigade in 1918 and later the 158th, 2nd and 5th Field Artillery Brigades in 1919. For his service during the war, Craig received the U.S. Distinguished Service Medal and a French Silver Plaque.

Personal life and education
Craig lived in Garnett, Kansas and died on 17 April 1929. He was married to Florence Elizabeth Burt on 19 May 1906. Craig was a graduate of the Mounted Service School (1910), the School of the Line (1912), the Army Staff College (1916) and the General Staff College (1921). Craig was an Episcopalian and Freemason, including a member of the Shriners.

References

1929 deaths
1875 births
Recipients of the Distinguished Service Medal (US Army)
United States Army generals of World War I
United States Army generals
Military personnel from Iowa